Magnus Samuelsson (born 21 May 1971) is a retired Swedish football defender.

References

1971 births
Living people
Swedish footballers
Bodens BK players
IFK Luleå players
Östers IF players
Djurgårdens IF Fotboll players
FC Lahti players
Örebro SK players
Raufoss IL players
Degerfors IF players
Association football defenders
Swedish expatriate footballers
Expatriate footballers in Finland
Swedish expatriate sportspeople in Finland
Expatriate footballers in Norway
Swedish expatriate sportspeople in Norway
Allsvenskan players
Superettan players
Norwegian First Division players